Alaska is a state situated in the northwest extremity of the North American continent. According to the 2010 United States Census, Alaska is the 3rd least populous state with 733,391  inhabitants but is the largest by land area spanning  of land. As of the 2020 Census, Alaska has 206 census-designated places.

Changes for 2020 include the addition of five census-designates places: Eareckson Station (last gazetted in 1980), Mill Bay, North Lakes, Petersburg (a former city), and South Lakes. Five former census-designates places counted for the 2010 census were not included in 2020: Edna Bay, incorporated in 2014; Lakes, split into North Lakes and South Lakes; New Allakaket, annexed by neighboring Allakaket in March 2015; Northway Junction, merged with Northway; and Whale Pass, incorporated in 2017.

Changes for 2010 include the addition of twelve new census-designated places: Badger, Chena Ridge, Eureka Roadhouse, Farmers Loop, Goldstream, Loring, Mertarvik, Nabesna, Point Possession, South Van Horn, Steele Creek, and Whitestone. Six former census-designated places counted for the 2000 census were not included in 2010: Alpine, Copperville (merged into Tazlina CDP), Cube Cove, Miller Landing (annexed to Homer city), Meyers Chuck and Thoms Place (both incorporated into Wrangell city and borough). Two former CDPs became cities: Adak (incorporated in 2001) and Gustavus (incorporated in 2004). Skagway (disincorporated in 2007) is now a census-designated place. Finally, one census-designated place has a new name: Y is now Susitna North.

List of census-designated places

List of former census-designated places

See also
 List of boroughs and census areas in Alaska
 List of cities in Alaska

References

Alaska
Lists of places in Alaska